The Nano/Bio Interface Center is a Nanoscale Science and Engineering Center at the University of Pennsylvania.  It specializes in bionanotechnology, combining aspects of life sciences and engineering, with a particular focus in biomolecular optoelectronics and molecular motions, including developing new scanning probe microscopy techniques. It offers a master's degree in nanotechnology. The center was established in 2004 with a US$11.6 million grant from the National Science Foundation, and received an additional $11.9 million grant in 2009. By 2013, it had constructed a new facility, the Krishna P. Singh Center for Nanotechnology.

Award for Research Excellence in Nanotechnology
The Award for Research Excellence in Nanotechnology is given by the Nano/Bio Interface Center each year to an outstanding researcher in nanotechnology. The award is given each year at the center's NanoDay outreach event.

References 

Nanotechnology institutions
University of Pennsylvania